Glen Marhevka is an American trumpet player. He grew up in Valencia, California, U.S.A., where he attended Wm. S. Hart High School.  He was mentored by George Stone, Dirk Fischer and Larry Thornton. After graduating from California State University, Northridge with a bachelor's degree in Trumpet Performance and working as a freelance musician he became a member of the Grammy nominated band Big Bad Voodoo Daddy of which he has been the featured trumpet soloist for over 21 years.

Glen has also performed and or recorded with artists such as Ben Harper, B.B. King, Gary Cherone, and Disney's Imagination Movers.

Glen is a Yamaha Artist and clinician.

Glen Marhevka has promoted music education in schools across the country.

References

Living people
American trumpeters
American male trumpeters
21st-century trumpeters
21st-century American male musicians
Year of birth missing (living people)